Charles "Kid" Carter (birthdate unknown)  was an American baseball pitcher in the pre-Negro leagues.

He pitched for the Philadelphia Giants playing alongside William Binga, Frank Grant, Harry Buckner, and Sol White.

References 

Brooklyn Royal Giants players
Philadelphia Giants players
Year of birth missing
Year of death missing